The Hardau valley accompanies the heath river, the Hardau, in the Suderburg area in Uelzen district in the German state of Lower Saxony.

There is a Hardau Valley Cultural History Water Experience Path (Kulturhistorischen Wassererlebnispfad Hardautal) that runs for 27 kilometres along the Hardau valley.

The Hardau valley eventually opens into the Gerdau valley.

Uelzen (district)
Valleys of Lower Saxony